Dosapadu is a village in Krishna District in the Indian state of Andhra Pradesh.

External links 
 http://www.krishna.gov.in/eldistrict2/htm/38.htm
 http://gloriousindia.com/places/ap/krishna.html
 https://web.archive.org/web/20101220072030/http://www.krishnadistrict.com/html/district-history.htm

Villages in Krishna district